Hans Adolf Broten (August 12, 1916 – October 19, 1992) was a Canadian politician, who represented the electoral district of Watrous in the Legislative Assembly of Saskatchewan from 1960 to 1967. He was a member of the Cooperative Commonwealth Federation.

His grandson is Cam Broten.

1916 births
1991 deaths
Canadian people of Norwegian descent
University of Saskatchewan alumni
Saskatchewan Co-operative Commonwealth Federation MLAs
20th-century Canadian legislators